Shakir Maratovich Mukhamadullin (born 10 January 2002) is a Russian professional ice hockey player for the San Jose Barracuda of the American Hockey League (AHL) as a prospect under contract to the San Jose Sharks of the National Hockey League (NHL). He was drafted 20th overall by the New Jersey Devils in the 2020 NHL Entry Draft.

Playing career
Mukhamadullin first played as youth within hometown club, Salavat Yulaev Ufa of the Kontinental Hockey League (KHL). On 22 November 2020, Mukhamadullin broke the KHL record for most points by an 18-year-old defenseman in a single season, previously held by Washington Capitals defenseman Dmitry Orlov.

During the 2021–22 season with Salavat, Mukhamadullin was signed to a three-year, entry-level contract with draft club, the New Jersey Devils on 1 December 2021. He was to remain on loan in the KHL with Salavat for the remainder of the season. Following the playoffs exit with Salavat, Mukhamadullin was assigned by the Devils to join AHL affiliate, the Utica Comets, for their post-season run. He made 3 appearances with the Comets, registering two assists.

On 14 July 2022, Mukhamadullin was re-assigned by the Devils to continue his development on loan with Salavat Yulaev Ufa for the 2022–23 season. In an increased role in responsibility on the blueline for Salavat, Mukhamadullin established new career bests with 6 goals and 25 points through 67 regular season games. 

On 26 February 2023, Mukhamadullin was traded by the New Jersey Devils to the San Jose Sharks in a blockbuster multi-player trade, which involved Timo Meier. Helping Salavat place second in the Eastern Conference, he notched a 1 goal and 2 points through 6 playoff games in a upset quarterfinals defeat to Admiral Vladivostok.

International play
Mukhamadullin represented Russia at the 2018 World U-17 Hockey Challenge, where he won a gold medal. He represented Russia at the 2019 Hlinka Gretzky Cup, where he recorded one assist in five games and won a gold medal. He again represented Russia at the 2019 IIHF World U18 Championships, where he won a silver medal. Mukhamadullin scored the game-winning goal in double-overtime at the 2019 World Junior A Challenge, helping Russia win their first gold medal in the World Junior A Challenge tournament.

Career statistics

Regular season and playoffs

International

References

External links
 

2002 births
Living people
National Hockey League first-round draft picks
New Jersey Devils draft picks
Russian ice hockey defencemen
Salavat Yulaev Ufa players
Sportspeople from Ufa
Tolpar Ufa players
Toros Neftekamsk players
Utica Comets players